Amaneyevo is a rural locality (a village) in Chaykovsky, Perm Krai, Russia. The population was 77 as of 2010. There are 2 streets.

Geography 
Amaneyevo is located 53 km northeast of Chaykovsky. Vassyata is the nearest rural locality.

References 

Rural localities in Chaykovsky urban okrug